The Charles River Dam is a flood control structure on the Charles River in Boston, Massachusetts,  located just downstream of the Leonard P. Zakim Bunker Hill Memorial Bridge, near Lovejoy Wharf, on the former location of the Warren Bridge.

History
The Charles River Dam was built by the U.S. Army Corps of Engineers. The structure also includes the "Colonel Richard Gridley Locks", named for General George Washington's first army engineer. Built and operational in 1978, the three locks can be crossed by pedestrians as well as bicyclists. It is part of the popular Boston Harborwalk. The dam contains three individual locks, with one wider than the other two to accommodate the occasional passing of a larger vessel. The structure also includes a fish passage.

The dam controls the surface level of the river basin as well its tributaries upstream, including the Back Bay Fens and Muddy River and to prevent sea water from entering the Charles River freshwater basin during high tides. The 1910 dam includes two locks (one under the Science Museum parking garage). Both locks are now kept open for navigation. The older dam could not keep sea water out and a layer of salt water accumulated at the bottom of the fresh water basin, contributing to pollution and fish migration problems.

The dam's walkway is the site of the "Charlestown Bells", an interactive art installation by Paul Matisse, consisting of a set of chimes mounted on the railing that passers-by can strike.  The work was refurbished in 2013 after it had fallen into disrepair.

The Charles River Dam was once in the shadow of the former Charlestown High Bridge located upstream.  It was replaced by the Leonard P. Zakim Bunker Hill Bridge just upstream.

References

External links

Crossings of the Charles River
Dams in Massachusetts
Buildings and structures in Boston
Dams completed in 1978